Unbound Feet: A Social History of Chinese Women in San Francisco is a 1995 non-fiction book written by Judy Yung and published by University of California Press. The book details the history of immigrant Chinese female population in San Francisco region.

References

1995 non-fiction books
English-language books
American non-fiction books
University of California Press books
Books about immigration to the United States